Albert Thévenon (16 September 1901 – 10 May 1959) was a French water polo player who competed at the 1928 Summer Olympics.

He was part of the French team which won the bronze medal. He played four matches.

See also
 List of Olympic medalists in water polo (men)

External links
 

1901 births
1959 deaths
Sportspeople from Lyon
French male water polo players
Olympic bronze medalists for France
Olympic water polo players of France
Water polo players at the 1928 Summer Olympics
Olympic medalists in water polo
Medalists at the 1928 Summer Olympics